Odontoglossum tenue, the delicate odontoglossum, is a species of orchid ranging from southern Ecuador to northwestern Peru.

tenue